The Czechoslovakia women's national artistic gymnastics team represented Czechoslovakia in FIG international competitions.

History
Czechoslovakia made its Olympic debut in 1936. In 1984, it joined the Soviet Union in boycotting the Olympic Games. In 1992, Czechoslovakia split into two separate nations: the Czech Republic and Slovakia.

Team competition results

Olympic Games
 1936 –  Silver medal
Jaroslava Bajerová, Vlasta Děkanová, Božena Dobešová, Vlasta Foltová, Anna Hřebřinová, Matylda Pálfyová, Zdeňka Veřmiřovská, Marie Větrovská
 1948 –  Gold medal
Zdeňka Honsová, Marie Kovářová, Miloslava Misáková, Milena Müllerová, Věra Růžičková, Olga Šilhánová, Božena Srncová, Zdeňka Veřmiřovská
 1952 –  Bronze medal
Hana Bobková, Alena Chadimová, Jana Rabasová, Alena Reichová, Matylda Matoušková-Šínová, Božena Srncová, Věra Vančurová, Eva Věchtová
 1956 – 5th place
Eva Bosáková, Miroslava Brdíčková, Věra Drazdíková, Anna Marejková, Matylda Matoušková-Šínová, Alena Reichová
 1960 –  Silver medal
Eva Bosáková, Věra Čáslavská, Matylda Matoušková-Šínová, Hana Růžičková, Ludmila Švédová, Adolfína Tkačíková
 1964 –  Silver medal
Věra Čáslavská, Marianna Némethová-Krajčírová, Jana Posnerová, Hana Růžičková, Jaroslava Sedláčková, Adolfína Tkačíková
 1968 –  Silver medal
Věra Čáslavská, Marianna Némethová-Krajčírová, Jana Kubičková, Hana Lišková, Bohumila Řimnáčová, Miroslava Skleničková
 1972 – 5th place
Marianna Némethová-Krajčírová, Zdena Dorňáková, Soňa Brázdová, Zdena Bujnáčková, Hana Lišková, Marcela Váchová
 1976 – 5th place
Anna Pohludková, Ingrid Holkovičová, Jana Knopová, Drahomíra Smolíková, Eva Pořádková, Alena Černáková
 1980 – 4th place
Eva Marečková, Radka Zemanová, Jana Labáková, Katarína Šarišská, Dana Brýdlová, Anita Šauerová
 1984 – did not participate due to boycott 
 1988 – 7th place
Iveta Poloková, Hana Říčná, Alena Dřevjaná, Ivona Krmelová, Martina Velíšková, Jana Vejrková

World Championships

 1934 –  gold medal
Maria Bajerová, Vlasta Děkanová, Vlasta Foltová, Eleonora Hajková, Vlasta Jarusková, Zdeňka Veřmiřovská
 1938 –  gold medal
Vlasta Děkanová, Božena Dobešová, Marie Hendrychová, Anna Nezerpová, Matylda Pálfyová, Marie Skálová, Zdeňka Veřmiřovská
 1954 –  bronze medal
Eva Bosáková, Miroslava Brdíčková, Alena Chadimová, Věra Drazdíková, Zdena Liškova, Anna Marejková, Alena Reichová, Věra Vančurová
 1958 –  silver medal
Eva Bosáková, Věra Čáslavská, Anna Marejková, Matylda Matoušková-Šínová, Ludmila Švédová, Adolfína Tkačíková
 1962 –  silver medal
Eva Bosáková, Věra Čáslavská, Libuše Cmíralová, Hana Růžičková, Ludmila Švédová, Adolfína Tkačíková
 1966 –  gold medal
Věra Čáslavská, Jaroslava Sedláčková, Marianna Némethová-Krajčírová, Jana Kubičková, Bohumila Řimnáčová, Jindra Košťálová
 1970 –  bronze medal
Soňa Brázdová, Ľubica Krásna, Hana Lišková, Marianna Némethová-Krajčírová, Bohumila Řimnáčová, Marcela Váchová
 1974 – 5th place
Zdena Dorňáková, Jana Knopová, Drahomíra Smolíková, Václava Soukupová, Zdena Bujnáčková, Božena Perdykulová
 1979 – 5th place
Věra Černá, Eva Marečková, Radka Zemanová, Katarína Šarišská, Anita Šauerová, Lenka Chatarová
 1981 – 5th place
Jana Labáková, Eva Marečková, Martina Polcrová, Jana Gajdošová, Jana Rulfová, Katarína Šarišská

Most decorated gymnasts
This list includes all Czechoslovakian female artistic gymnasts who have won at least four medals at the Olympic Games and the World Artistic Gymnastics Championships combined.  Not included are medals won at the 1984 Friendship Games (alternative Olympics).

References

National women's artistic gymnastics teams
Gymnastics